Hans Wagner  may refer to:

 Honus Wagner (1874–1955), baseball player and Hall of Fame shortstop
 Hans Wagner (entomologist) (1884-1949), German entomologist; see Trichapion
 Hans Wagner (general) (1896–1967), German World War II general
 Hans Wagner (medicine) (1905–1989), Swiss ophthalmologist
 Hans Wagner (sculptor) (1905–1982), German sculptor and painter
 Hans Wagner (ice hockey) (1923-2010), Austrian ice hockey player
 Hans Wagner (bobsleigh) (fl. 1979), West German bobsledder
 Hans Wagner (politician), West German politician and president of the Landtag of Hesse, 1974–1982
 Hans Wagner (type designer), German type designer for Ludwig & Mayer type foundry
 Hans Wagner, protagonist of the 1903 musical comedy The Prince of Pilsen

See also 
Julius Wagner (nicknamed Hans, 1906–1960), American football and wrestling coach